The 2013–14 UAE President's Cup is the 38th season of the UAE President's Cup, the premier knockout tournament for association football clubs in the United Arab Emirates. The reigning champions are Al Ahli, having won their eighth title last season which is a national record held jointly with Al-Sharjah. The winners will qualify for the group stage of the 2015 AFC Champions League.

After a change to the format from the 2011–12 season was a success last year, then the competition will continue along the same lines. 14 teams from UAE Division 1 took place in a group stage with 2 groups of four and 2 groups of three, with the group winners advancing to a play-off stage.  The two winners of the play-off matches will join the 14 Pro-League teams in the round of 16.

First round

Group A

Group B

Group C

Group D

Second round
The four group winners from the first round entered at this stage.

The winners of each match advanced to the round of 16.

Round of 16
The two winning teams from the second round join the 14 Pro-League teams in this round.

Quarter-finals

Semi-finals

Final

References

UAE President's Cup seasons
Uae President's Cup